Ilunga Mukendi (born ) is a Zaire-born South African rugby union player for the  in the Currie Cup and the  in the Rugby Challenge. His regular position is wing.

References

South African rugby union players
Democratic Republic of the Congo rugby union players
Living people
1997 births
People from Lubumbashi
Rugby union wings
Sharks (Currie Cup) players
Democratic Republic of the Congo emigrants to South Africa
Golden Lions players
Lions (United Rugby Championship) players